Nītaure is a village in Nītaure Parish, Cēsis Municipality in the Vidzeme region of Latvia. Nītaure had 450 residents as of 2006. Olympian Haralds Marvē was born here.

References

External links 
 

Towns and villages in Latvia
Kreis Riga
Cēsis Municipality
Vidzeme